Thi Viet Huong Truong is an Australian politician. She was a Greens member of the Victorian Legislative Council, having represented Western Metropolitan Region from February 2018, when she was appointed to the vacancy resulting from Colleen Hartland's resignation, until her defeat at the 2018 Victorian state election.

Her parents came from Vietnam as refugees by boat following the Vietnam War. She graduated from the University of Melbourne with a Bachelor of Arts in 2005, and from RMIT with a Master of Social Science in Environment and Planning in 2009. She had previously worked as the Sustainability Coordinator at Brimbank City Council from 2008 to 2018. She served on the Victorian Parliamentary Environment and Planning Committee.

References

Year of birth missing (living people)
Living people
Australian Greens members of the Parliament of Victoria
Members of the Victorian Legislative Council
21st-century Australian politicians
Women members of the Victorian Legislative Council
Victoria (Australia) local councillors
Australian politicians of Vietnamese descent
Women local councillors in Australia
21st-century Australian women politicians